La moda is a 2012 studio album by Italian singer Garbo. For this, the singer's fourteenth album, most of the songs were co-written with Luca Urbani, ex :it:Soerba. Reviewers noted the influence, beyond Garbo's debt to David Bowie, of Virgin Prunes, Depeche Mode and Nine Inch Nails.

Track listing
"Sembra" – 4:49
"La moda" – 3:24
"Sexy" – 4:25
"Quando cammino, Pt. 2" – 3:31
"Sparare" – 5:24
"Gira in continuazione, Pt. 3" – 3:46
"Movimento notturno" – 7:07
"Errori" – 3:40
"Metà cielo" – 4:22
"Architettura MIG" – 8:50

References

2012 albums